A Yankee Go-Getter is a 1921 American silent drama film directed by Duke Worne and starring Neva Gerber.

The film is preserved at the Library of Congress Packard Campus for Audio-Visual Conservation.

Cast
 Neva Gerber as Lucia Robilant / Vera Robilant
 James Morrison as Barry West
 Joseph W. Girard as Nicholas Lanza (credited as Joseph Girard)
 Ashton Dearholt as Tronto

References

External links

1921 films
American silent feature films
Films directed by Duke Worne
1921 drama films
American black-and-white films
Silent American drama films
Arrow Film Corporation films
1920s American films